Asher Chazen Grodman (born July 28, 1987) is an American actor and producer who stars in the CBS series Ghosts.

Early life and education 
Grodman was born in New York City. His father, Marc Grodman, an assistant professor at Columbia University College of Physicians and Surgeons, is the founder of BioReference, a biotech company and led several biotech companies including GeneDx and Genosity. Grodman attended Newark Academy and graduated from Columbia University in 2010 with a degree in film and English. He was a member of Columbia's varsity fencing team. Grodman also holds a MFA from the American Conservatory Theater in San Francisco.

Grodman is of Jewish background.

Career 
Grodman wrote, directed, and produced The Train, a short film starring Academy Award-winning actor Eli Wallach. The film has been featured in many film festivals such as the Cleveland International Film Festival, Vancouver International Film Festival, Sedona International Film Festival, and the Rhode Island International Film Festival.

Grodman stars in the CBS series Ghosts, where he plays the character of Trevor, a Wall Street stockbroker.

Grodman is an adjunct lecturer at Hunter College and he also taught acting to inmates in Rikers Island.

Filmography

Film

Television

References 

1987 births
Male actors from New York City
American people of Jewish descent
Columbia Lions fencers
Living people
21st-century American actors
American television actors
Hunter College faculty
Newark Academy alumni
American Conservatory Theater alumni